Alef Aeronautics is a United States venture-backed automotive and aviation company. It has been in  development of a flying car since 2015.

Financing 
The company was originally self-financed by its founders. In 2017 Alef received a Seed investment from Draper Associates followed by another investment round in 2018. In 2020 Alef added number of VC firms, family offices and angel investors. This followed by a set of rounds in 2021 and 2022, largely from existing investors, with addition of several new investors. The list of investors include Draper Associates, Draper B1, Impact Venture Capital, Strong VC, and Luis Scola.

Technology and service 
The Alef flying car is intended to be a personal car fitting into existing driving and parking infrastructure. For driving on land, it uses hub motors while for vertical flight, the Alef features 8 motor-controller-propeller systems in Distributed Electric Propulsion and a top of the car Mesh to allow the airflow.

To solve the issue of inefficient battery use in vertical flight because of small size, large weight, and absence of the wings, Alef uses Transition. Transition is achieved by reusing the right and left sides of the car and the top and bottom wings, turning in flight on its sides, thus creating a biplane / circular wing type of aircraft for a long-distance flight.
For a short range hoping over an obstacle Alef proposes low-altitude hover over a problem area, flying forward until a safe place to land, and continuation of driving. Alef calls this a "HOP" scenario.

Alef stated that it plans to use traditional automotive business model, rather than aviation/taxi business model as many eVTOLs do. Hence, Alef stated that it wants to disrupt the automotive market rather than aviation.
The intended use on the ground similar to a car and in the air similar to a small airplane or a drone.

See also 
 AeroMobil (car with expendable wings needing airport runway)
 Joby (electrical Vertical TakeOff and Landing multicopter)
 EHang (electric helicopter)
 Archer Aviation (eVTOL)

References

External links
 

Automotive companies of the United States
Aerospace companies of the United States
Aircraft manufacturers of the United States
American companies established in 2009
Electric aircraft
Emerging technologies
Flying cars in fiction
Manufacturing companies based in California
Companies based in San Mateo, California
Roadable aircraft
Urban air mobility